is a Japanese actor and singer who starred in the musicals Evita, The Phantom of the Opera, and Les Misérables.

Songs
 Hyakujuu Sentai Gaoranger:

References 

1957 births
Living people